Alberto Bucci (25 May 1948 – 9 March 2019) was an Italian professional basketball coach who served as president of Virtus Bologna from 2016 to 2019. Having won three Italian championships and four Italian Cups, Bucci was widely considered one of the greatest Italian coaches of all time.

Career
Alberto Bucci began his coaching career at just 25 years (1974) as head coach of Alco Bologna in the place of outgoing Giuseppe Guerrieri.  

The following season found him at Rimini where he stayed for five seasons (1974–79) and led the team from D division to Serie A2. After saving the club from the drop, he joined Fabriano. 

In the 1981-82 season he helped the team to reach the top division (Serie A), while the following year he saved them from relegation. His successful job in Fabriano was recognized by Virtus Bologna who gave him charge of the club for the next two years (1983–85). At Bologna, he immediately led the Granarolo to their first golden star with the winning of the double (Italian League & Italian Cup) against the super competitive team of Simac Milano. 

His second year in Virtus was mediocre, reaching seventh place in the championship, while in the 1984–85 FIBA European Champions Cup they got to the top six where they came last in the group. Leaving the city of Bologna, he spent six years coaching in Serie A2 coaching, first at Enichem Livorno and then Glaxo Verona getting the unique achievement, the conquest of the Italian Cup (against Philips Milano) for the first and only time in history by club from A2 (1990–91). Following these successes, he joined Scavolini Pesaro. The participation of the team in the final of the play-offs and the winning of the Italian Cup made its year successful, despite the club's defeat in the double final of 1991–92 FIBA Korać Cup by il Messaggero Roma of the Croatian superstar Dino Rađa. 

In the 1992-93 season Alberto Bucci led Scavolini to the play-off semi-final despite the 7th place of the regular season, while in 1992–93 FIBA European League they reached the quarter-finals where they were eliminated by Benetton Treviso, coached another Croatian superstar, Toni Kukoč. 

In the summer of 1993 Ettore Messina withdraw from Virtus Bologna tο take charge of the national team, which led Alberto Bucci to return to the Bianconero of Bologna after eight years. He stayed there for four years and thanks to a well-built roster which had enough Italian internationals and foreign players in class of "Saša" Danilović and Arijan Komazec, he won two domestic leagues (1993–94, 1994–95), an Italian Cup (1996–97) and a Super Cup (1995). Despite the domestic titles, Alberto Bucci couldn't lead Virtus to do the overrun in Europe and get to a Final Four after being eliminated twice in the quarter-finals by Olympiacos (1993-94) and Panathinaikos (1994-95), while twice reaching only the last 16 (1995-96, 1996-97). 

In the summer of 1997 he resigned from Virtus and almost abruptly from the scene. His hiring by Fabriano in the 1999-2000 season and Progresso Castelmaggiore the 2003-04 season were his last jobs with professional clubs.

In 2016 Bucci was appointed president of Virtus Bologna.

Bucci died on 9 March 2019, due to complications from a cancer; tributes were paid by all the Italian sports movement, notably including his close friend and fellow sports manager Carlo Ancelotti.

Career achievements and awards
 Italian League: 3 (with Virtus Bologna: 1983-84, 1993–94, 1994–95)
 Italian Cup: 4 (with Virtus Bologna: 1983-84, 1996–97, with Scaligera Verona: 1990-91 and Victoria Libertas Pesaro: 1991-92)
 Italian Supercup: 1 (with Virtus Bologna: 1995)
 promotions in Serie A1: 3 (with Fabriano: 1981-82, with Libertas Livorno: 1985-86 and Scaligera Verona: 1990-91)

also
 FIBA European Champions Cup quarterfinalist - (with Virtus Bologna: 1984-85, 1993-94, 1994-95 and Victoria Libertas Pesaro: 1992-93)
 FIBA Korać Cup finalist - (with Victoria Libertas Pesaro: 1991-92)
 Italian Basketball Hall of Fame: (2015)

References

External links
Italian League Coach Profile 

1948 births
2019 deaths
Fortitudo Pallacanestro Bologna coaches
Italian basketball coaches
Victoria Libertas Pesaro coaches
Virtus Bologna coaches
Basket Rimini Crabs coaches
Scaligera Basket Verona coaches
Deaths from cancer in Emilia-Romagna
Sportspeople from Bologna